Events in the year 1954 in Germany.

Incumbents
President –  Theodor Heuss 
Chancellor –  Konrad Adenauer

Events 
 18 to 29 June - 4th Berlin International Film Festival
 4 July - Germany wins in 1954 FIFA World Cup Final
17 October - East German general election, 1954
Date unknown - Wittig reaction was discovered by Georg Wittig.
Date unknown -  The Angle grinder is invented by German company Ackermann + Schmitt (FLEX-Elektrowerkzeuge GmbH).
 Date unknown - The first electric drip brew coffeemaker is patented in Germany and named the Wigomat after its inventor Gottlob Widmann.

Births 
 4 January - Birgit Havenstein, German composer
 16 January - Wolfgang Schmidt, German track and field athlete
 19 January - Katharina Thalbach, German actress
 19 January - Joachim Deckarm, German handball player
 21 January - Thomas de Maizière, German politician
 10 February - Peter Ramsauer, German politician
 19 February  - Reiner Haseloff, German politician
 26 February  - Prince Ernst August of Hanover, German head of the deposed royal House of Hanover
 1 March - Volker Wieker, German chief of staff of the Bundeswehr
 6 March - Harald Schumacher, German football player
 26 March - Jutta Speidel, German actress
 26 March - Udo Di Fabio, German judge
 1 April - Dieter Müller, German football player
 9 April - Arnold Stadler, German writer
 16 April - Sibylle Lewitscharoff, German author
 19 April - Ingrid Peters, German singer
 20 April - Gero von Boehm, German journalist
 20 April - Martin Stratmann, German electrochemist and materials scientist
 21 April - Sabine Engel, German discus thrower
 1 May - Eckart Diesch, German sailor
 24 May - Rainald Goetz, German author, playwright and essayist
 8 June - Jochen Schümann, German sailor
 10 June - Ute Frevert, German historian
 13 June - Heiner Koch, German bishop of Roman Catholic Church
 20 June - Karlheinz Brandenburg, German electrical engineer and mathematician
 3 July - Herbert Hainer, German businessman
 17 July - Angela Merkel, German politician, Chancellor of Germany
 25 July - Jürgen Trittin, German politician
 28 July - Gerd Faltings, German mathematician
 14 August - Berthold Albrecht, German entrepreneur (died 2012)
 11 October - Sascha Hehn, German actor
 12 October - Norbert Klaar, German sport shooter
 3 November - Siegfried Mauser, German pianist
 25 November - Rudolf Mellinghoff, German judge
 14 December - Eva Mattes, German actress
 24 December - Lorenz Caffier, German politician

Deaths
January 15 - Hermann Höpker-Aschoff, German judge and politician (born 1883)
January 19 - Cornelius van Oyen, German sport shooter (born 1886)
January 22 - Princess Margaret of Prussia, Prussian princess (born 1872)
February 6 - Friedrich Meinecke, German historian (born 1862)
March 6 
 Hermann Dietrich, German politician (born 1879)
 Charles Edward, Duke of Saxe-Coburg and Gotha (born 1884 in the United Kingdom)
March 7 — Otto Diels, German chemist (born 1876)
April 14 -Siegfried von Roedern, German politician (born 1870)
May 6 - Duchess Cecilie of Mecklenburg-Schwerin, German crown princess (born 1886)
May 19 - Johannes Joseph van der Velden, German bishop of Roman Catholic Church (born 1891)
June 14 - Hermann Wolfgang von Waltershausen, German composer and conductor (born 1882)
June 27 - Theodor Loos, German actor (born 1883)
July 1 - Thea von Harbou, German actress, novelist and film director (born 1888)
July 16 - Herms Niel, German composer (born 1888)
August 4 - Harald Paulsen, German actor (born 1895)
August 7 - Wilhelm Dittmann, German politician (born 1874)
August 25- Johannes Stroux, German philologist and writer (born 1886)
September 5 - Eugen Schiffer, German politician (born 1860)
September 27 - Maximilian von Weichs, German field marshal (born 1881)
October 29 - Hermann Ehlers, German politician (born 1904)
October 30 - Gustav Dahrendorf, German politician (born 1901)
November 11 - Reinhold Schünzel, German actor (born 1886)
November 30 - Wilhelm Furtwängler, German conductor and composer (born 1886)
December 14 - Emil Rausch, German swimmer (born 1883)
December 30 - Günther Quandt, German industrialist (born 1881)
Date unknown — Franz Brandt, World War I German flying ace (born 1893)

See also
1954 in German television

References

 
1950s in Germany
Years of the 20th century in Germany
Germany
Germany